Billy Winn may refer to:

 Billy Winn (racing driver) (1909–1938)
 Billy Winn (American football) (1989–)
 William Winn (1945–2006)